In mathematics and the field of transportation theory, the transport functions J(n,x) are defined by 

Note that

Special functions

See also 
 Transportation theory
 Incomplete gamma function